The Ashland Railway   is a Class III railroad shortline railroad operating within North Central Ohio and based in Mansfield, Ohio. Since its inception in 1986, Ashland Railway has grown to provide service 24 hours a day 7 days a week along 55 miles of track in two segments, to industries within Ashland, Huron, Richland and Wayne counties. ASRY interchanges with the Norfolk Southern Railway in Mansfield, the Wheeling & Lake Erie Railway in Plymouth and CSX Transportation (CSXT) in Willard. The line runs southeast from Willard through Plymouth and Shelby, to Mansfield. From Mansfield the line runs northeast through Ashland and terminates in West Salem.

The shortline operates on two separate lines that connect in Mansfield, Ohio. The "original" Ashland mainline, which began operations in 1986, was purchased from Conrail. This line's heritage goes back to the Erie Lackawanna Railway (EL) and was a segment in their Chicago - New York main line. After Conrail took control of the Erie Lackawanna, most of its trackage was deemed redundant and removed in large sections. The portion east of West Salem and the portions west of Mansfield were removed around 1984. Conrail retained ownership of the EL line between Mansfield and Ontario, to service a GM plant. The crossing with the Conrail (former Pennsylvania Railroad) Ft. Wayne Line was removed, and spur tracks were built to interchange traffic on either side. 

The second portion of the Ashland Railway is the Willard to Mansfield section. This was operated by the Baltimore and Ohio Railroad as a line between the docks on Lake Erie to south-central Ohio, including the city of Mt. Vernon, Ohio. Because of economic downturns in the 1980s, freight traffic declined drastically on this line and it was later reduced to a branchline between Willard and Mansfield. By 1990, the new CSX Transportation was ready to part with this line, and sold it to the Ashland Railway as well. Before the purchase of this CSX line, the Ashland was limited to only one interchange, with Conrail in Mansfield. 

In the village of Plymouth, the line passed the former Plymouth Locomotive Works plant, shuttered since 1999.

The railway has built a spur line to serve an industrial park in Ashland.

In 1924, the Chesapeake and Ohio Railway was considering buying the Ashland Railway, a separate company from the current one by that name.

References

External links

HawkinsRails - Ashland Railway

Ohio railroads
Railway companies established in 1986
1986 establishments in Ohio